

2010 
April 6
Apple releases the original iPad.
June 24
Apple releases the iPhone 4.

2011 
May 4
Intel announces the commercialisation of 3D transistors, a variant of the FinFET.
May 17
Lenovo releases first ThinkPad X1.
June 15
The first Chromebooks, by Acer and Samsung, go on sale. 
September 7
The first 4 terabyte hard drive is released by Seagate.

2012 
February 29
Raspberry Pi, a bare-bones, low-cost credit-card sized computer created by volunteers mostly drawn from academia and the UK tech industry, is released to help teach children to code.
September 11
Intel demonstrates its Next Unit of Computing, a motherboard measuring only .
October 4
TDK demonstrates a 2 terabyte hard drive on a single 3.5-inch platter.
October 26
Microsoft releases the operating system Windows 8.
November 18
Nintendo releases the Wii U in North America.

2013 
June 11
Apple releases the first Retina Display MacBook Pro.
September 20
Apple releases the iPhone 5S, powered by the Apple A7 SoC which the company proclaimed to be the first 64 bit processor to be used on a smartphone.
November 15
Sony releases the PlayStation 4 in the United States.
November 22
Microsoft releases Xbox One.
November 29
Sony releases the PlayStation 4 in Europe.

2014 
August 26
The first 8 terabyte hard drive is released by Seagate.
Google releases the 64-bit version of Chrome for Windows.
August 29
Intel unveiled its first eight-core desktop processor, the Intel Core i7-5960X.

2015 
July 29
Microsoft releases the operating system Windows 10.
October 15
AlphaGo was the first Go AI computer program developed by Google to defeat a professional human opponent on a full-sized board without handicap.

2016 
January 12
The High Bandwidth Memory 2 standard is released by JEDEC.
January 13
Fixstars Solutions releases the world's first 13 TB SSD.
March 4
Scientists at MIT created the first five-atom quantum computer with the potential to crack the security of traditional encryption schemes.

2017 
March 2
AMD launches the Ryzen CPU architecture.
March 3
Nintendo releases the hybrid gaming console Nintendo Switch.

2018

2019 
January 9
Lexar announces the first SD card which can store 1 terabyte.
September 20
Google claims to have achieved quantum supremacy.

References 

2010
2010s in technology
Computing